Kana Lais Oya (born November 10, 1987), simply known as , is a Brazilian model who is represented by the talent agency, LDH. She was raised in Shizuoka.

Biography
Oya was born in Belém, Brazil. Her mother is Japanese Brazilian and her father is Brazilian. She emigrated to Shizuoka Prefecture when she was three years old.

In 2003, she was a finalist for Elite Model Look. Oya debuted as a model when she was seventeen years old.

In 2005, she moved to Tokyo after graduating from high school to start her full-scale model activities.

In August 2013, Oya moved from Elite Japan (now Name Management) to LDH.

On September 24, 2022, she married actor Sen Mitsuji.

Bibliography

Magazines
 Vivi, Kodansha 1983-, as an exclusive model from 2005 to 2009
 Glamorous, Kodansha 2005–2013, as an exclusive model from 2005 to 2013
 Sweet, Takarajimasha 1999-, as a regular model since 2007
 More, Shueisha 1977-, as a regular model from 2009 to 2014
 Ginger, Gentosha 2009-, as a regular model from 2009 to 2014
 Gina, Bunkasha, as an exclusive model since 2011
 Baila, Shueisha, as a regular model since 2014

Filmography

Catalogs

Advertisements

Events

Music Videos

TV series

Dramas

Films

References

External links
Official profile 
 

Japanese female models
Japanese gravure models
Japanese actresses
1987 births
Living people
Models from Shizuoka Prefecture
Japanese people of Brazilian descent